Franklin County is a county located in the U.S. state of Alabama. As of the 2020 census, the population was 32,113. Its county seat is Russellville. Its name is in honor of Benjamin Franklin, famous statesman, scientist, and printer. It is a dry county, although the city of Russellville is wet.

History
Franklin County was established on February 6, 1818.

Colbert County
Colbert County was originally established on February 6, 1867, after it split from Franklin County over political issues after the American Civil War.  It was abolished eight months later by an Alabama constitutional convention and then reestablished on February 24, 1870.

Musical history
Many musicians and songwriters are from Franklin County including Billy Sherrill, Ricky Pierce, Eddie Martin and many others.

Geography

Adjacent Counties
Colbert County (north)
Lawrence County (east)
Winston County (southeast)
Marion County (south)
Itawamba County, Mississippi (southwest)
Tishomingo County, Mississippi (northwest)

National protected area
 William B. Bankhead National Forest (part)

Transportation

Major Highways
 U.S. Highway 43
 State Route 13
 State Route 17
 State Route 19
 State Route 24
 State Route 172
 State Route 187
 State Route 237
 State Route 241
 State Route 243
 State Route 247

Rail
Norfolk Southern Railway
Redmont Railway

Demographics

2000
At the 2000 census there were 31,223 people, 12,259 households, and 8,949 families living in the county.  The population density was 49 people per square mile (19/km2).  There were 13,749 housing units at an average density of 22 per square mile (8/km2).  The racial makeup of the county was 89.68% White (non-Hispanic), 4.21% Black or African American, 0.33% Native American, 0.11% Asian, 0.10% Pacific Islander, 4.62% from other races, and 0.96% from two or more races.  5.82% of the population were Hispanic or Latino of any race.
Of the 12,259 households 32.50% had children under the age of 18 living with them, 59.20% were married couples living together, 10.40% had a female householder with no husband present, and 27.00% were non-families. 24.50% of households were one person and 12.10% were one person aged 65 or older.  The average household size was 2.51 and the average family size was 2.97.

The age distribution was 24.50% under the age of 18, 9.20% from 18 to 24, 28.00% from 25 to 44, 23.40% from 45 to 64, and 14.90% 65 or older.  The median age was 37 years. For every 100 females there were 96.40 males.  For every 100 females age 18 and over, there were 92.80 males.

The median household income was $27,177 and the median family income  was $34,274. Males had a median income of $27,497 versus $18,631 for females. The per capita income for the county was $14,814.  About 15.20% of families and 18.90% of the population were below the poverty line, including 24.60% of those under age 18 and 24.10% of those age 65 or over.

2010
At the 2010 census there were 31,704 people, 12,286 households, and 8,741 families living in the county. The population density was 57 people per square mile (22 km2). There were 14,022 housing units at an average density of 21.7 per square mile (8/km2). The racial makeup of the county was 83.0% White (non-Hispanic), 3.9% Black or African American, 0.7% Native American, 0.2% Asian, 0.0% Pacific Islander, 10.5% from other races, and 1.7% from two or more races. 14.9% of the population were Hispanic or Latino of any race.
Of the 12,286 households 30.0% had children under the age of 18 living with them, 53.5% were married couples living together, 12.3% had a female householder with no husband present, and 28.9% were non-families. 26.1% of households were one person and 12.3% were one person aged 65 or older.  The average household size was 2.56 and the average family size was 3.05

The age distribution was 24.8% under the age of 18, 8.9% from 18 to 24, 25.8% from 25 to 44, 25.3% from 45 to 64, and 15.2% 65 or older. The median age was 37.8 years. For every 100 females there were 99.7 males.  For every 100 females age 18 and over, there were 104.3 males.

The median household income was $33,942 and the median family income  was $44,352. Males had a median income of $31,997 versus $22,747 for females. The per capita income for the county was $18,094.  About 14.9% of families and 19.5% of the population were below the poverty line, including 26.2% of those under age 18 and 13.2% of those age 65 or over.

2020

As of the 2020 United States census, there were 32,113 people, 11,048 households, and 7,669 families residing in the county.

Education
There are two school systems and one community college in Franklin County; Russellville City Schools and Franklin County Schools. Northwest Shoals Community College has a campus in Phil Campbell.

Russellville City Schools include:
Russellville High School
Russellville Middle School
Russellville Elementary School (grades 3 - 5)
West Elementary School (grades Kindergarten - 2)

Franklin County Schools include:
Belgreen High School (grades K - 12)
East Franklin Junior High School (grades K - 9)
Phil Campbell High School (two separate buildings serving grades K - 12)
Red Bay High School (grades K - 12)
Tharptown High School (grades K-12)
Vina High School (grades K - 12)

There is also the Franklin County Career-Technical Center, located next to Belgreen High School.

Government
Like most rural counties in Alabama, Franklin County has gone solidly Republican in the 21st century, but it has flirted with the party at a federal level since the 1950s. In a pattern typical of most rural Alabama counties, Franklin County supported the Dixiecrats in 1948 and George Wallace in 1968, but unlike other counties, had been won by Republicans in 1956 and 1960, cracking the wall of the Solid South before full-fledged turnover in 1964 and beyond.

As is the case with most rural counties nationwide that supported Bill Clinton in the 1996 election, the county has turned on the Democratic Party. In the 2020 election, Donald Trump won convincingly over Joe Biden, 83–17, continuing a backsliding trend for Democratic candidates in the rural South.

Communities

Cities
Red Bay
Russellville (county seat)

Towns
Hodges
Phil Campbell
Vina

Census-designated places
Belgreen
Spruce Pine

Unincorporated communities
Atwood
Burntout
Frankfort
Halltown
Liberty Hill
Nix
Old Burleson
Pleasant Site
Pogo

See also
National Register of Historic Places listings in Franklin County, Alabama
Properties on the Alabama Register of Landmarks and Heritage in Franklin County, Alabama

References

External links
 Franklin County, Alabama
 Franklin County Chamber of Commerce
 Bay Tree Council for the Performing Arts

 

 
1818 establishments in Alabama Territory
Populated places established in 1818
Counties of Appalachia